La comunidad (UK title: Common Wealth) is a 2000 Spanish black comedy film directed by Álex de la Iglesia.

Driven by the ambition and greed of the characters to the point of the degradation of their human condition, the plot concerns the developments in a homeowner community in Madrid upon the finding of 300 million ₧ in the appartment of a dead man by real estate agent Julia (Carmen Maura). Maura garnered critical acclaim for her performance and scooped a Silver Shell and a Goya Award for Best Actress.

Plot
The plot is set in Madrid. Julia, a real estate agent, discovers 300 million ₧ in the apartment of a dead man. Unfortunately, the neighbors have been waiting for the man to die so that they can seize the money for themselves.

Cast

Production 

The film was produced by LolaFilms and it had the participation of Antena 3 and Vía Digital.
The fictional building is credited to be Carrera de San Jerónimo 14.

Release 
The film screened as the opening film of the 48th San Sebastián International Film Festival (SSIFF) on 21 September 2000. It was theatrically released in Spain on 29 September 2000.

La comunidad grossed 1,601,861 ticket sales and €6,709,857.51 (highest grossing Spanish film of 2000).

Accolades 

|-
| align = "center" | 2000 || 48th San Sebastián International Film Festival || Silver Shell for Best Actress || Carmen Maura ||  || 
|-
| rowspan = "15" align = "center" | 2001 || rowspan = "15" | 15th Goya Awards || colspan = "2" | Best Film ||  || rowspan = "15" | 
|-
| Best Director || Álex de la Iglesia || 
|-
| Best Original Screenplay || Jorge Guerricaechevarría, Álex de la Iglesia || 
|-
| Best Original Score || Roque Baños || 
|-
| Best Actress || Carmen Maura ||  
|-
| Best Supporting Actor || Emilio Gutiérrez Caba || 
|-
| Best Supporting Actress || Terele Pávez || 
|-
| Best Production Supervision || Juanma Pagazaurtundua || 
|-
| Best Cinematography || Kiko de la Rica || 
|-
| Best Editing || Alejandro Lázaro || 
|-
| Best Art Direction || José Luis Arrizabalaga "Arri", Arturo García "Biaffra" || 
|-
| Best Costume Design || Paco Delgado || 
|-
| Best Makeup and Hairstyles || José Quetglás, Mercedes Guillot || 
|-
| Best Sound || Antonio Rodríguez "Mármol", Jaime Fernández, James Muñoz, Enrique Domínguez, José Vinader || 
|-
| Best Special Effects || Félix Bergés, Raúl Romanillos, Pau Costa, Julio Navarro || 
|}

See also 
 List of Spanish films of 2000

References

Citations

Bibliography

External links
 
 

2000 films
2000 black comedy films
2000s thriller films
Spanish black comedy films
Spanish crime comedy films
Films directed by Álex de la Iglesia
Films featuring a Best Actress Goya Award-winning performance
Films featuring a Best Supporting Actor Goya Award-winning performance
Films set in Madrid
Films shot in Madrid
2000s Spanish-language films
Films scored by Roque Baños
Films with screenplays by Jorge Guerricaechevarría
2000 comedy films
LolaFilms films
2000s Spanish films